Khvoshnam (also Romanized as Khvoshnām, Khowshnām, and Khushnām; also known as Khvoshnāmī) is a village in Dowlatabad Rural District, in the Central District of Abhar County, Zanjan Province, Iran. At the 2006 census, its population was 487, in 100 families.

References 

Populated places in Abhar County